François-Barthélemy de Salignac-Fénelon (born 1691 in Sainte-Mondane) was a French clergyman and bishop for the Roman Catholic Diocese of Pamiers. He was ordained in 1717. He was appointed bishop in 1735. He died in 1741.

References 

1691 births
1741 deaths
French Roman Catholic bishops